Jung Hoon-sung (born February 22, 1994) is a South Korean football player who currently plays as a winger for Busan IPark in the K League 2.

Playing career
Jung Hoon-sung played for V-Varen Nagasaki and Grulla Morioka from 2013 to 2015.

References

External links

1994 births
Living people
Expatriate footballers in Japan
J2 League players
J3 League players
V-Varen Nagasaki players
Iwate Grulla Morioka players
South Korean footballers
South Korean expatriate footballers
Association football midfielders